Sukhodol is a rural locality (a village) in Tashlinsky Selsoviet, Gafuriysky District, Bashkortostan, Russia. The population was 2 as of 2010. There are 2 streets.

Geography 
Sukhodol is located 17 km northeast of Krasnousolsky (the district's administrative centre) by road. Tashla is the nearest rural locality.

References 

Rural localities in Gafuriysky District